Colorectal cancer (CRC), also known as bowel cancer, colon cancer, or rectal cancer, is the development of cancer from the colon or rectum (parts of the large intestine). Signs and symptoms may include blood in the stool, a change in bowel movements, weight loss, and fatigue. Most colorectal cancers are due to old age and lifestyle factors, with only a small number of cases due to underlying genetic disorders. Risk factors include diet, obesity, smoking, and lack of physical activity. Dietary factors that increase the risk include red meat, processed meat, and alcohol. Another risk factor is inflammatory bowel disease, which includes Crohn's disease and ulcerative colitis. Some of the inherited genetic disorders that can cause colorectal cancer include familial adenomatous polyposis and hereditary non-polyposis colon cancer; however, these represent less than 5% of cases. It typically starts as a benign tumor, often in the form of a polyp, which over time becomes cancerous.

Colorectal cancer may be diagnosed by obtaining a sample of the colon during a sigmoidoscopy or colonoscopy. This is then followed by medical imaging to determine whether the disease has spread. Screening is effective for preventing and decreasing deaths from colorectal cancer. Screening, by one of a number of methods, is recommended starting from the age of 45 to 75. It was recommended starting at age 50 but it was changed to 45 due to increasing amount of colon cancers. During colonoscopy, small polyps may be removed if found. If a large polyp or tumor is found, a biopsy may be performed to check if it is cancerous. Aspirin and other non-steroidal anti-inflammatory drugs decrease the risk of pain during polyp excision. Their general use is not recommended for this purpose, however, due to side effects.

Treatments used for colorectal cancer may include some combination of surgery, radiation therapy, chemotherapy, and targeted therapy. Cancers that are confined within the wall of the colon may be curable with surgery, while cancer that has spread widely is usually not curable, with management being directed towards improving quality of life and symptoms. The five-year survival rate in the United States was around 65% in 2014. The individual likelihood of survival depends on how advanced the cancer is, whether or not all the cancer can be removed with surgery, and the person's overall health. Globally, colorectal cancer is the third most common type of cancer, making up about 10% of all cases. In 2018, there were 1.09 million new cases and 551,000 deaths from the disease. It is more common in developed countries, where more than 65% of cases are found. It is less common in women than men.

Signs and symptoms
The signs and symptoms of colorectal cancer depend on the location of the tumor in the bowel, and whether it has spread elsewhere in the body (metastasis). The classic warning signs include: worsening constipation, blood in the stool, decrease in stool caliber (thickness), loss of appetite, loss of weight, and nausea or vomiting in someone over 50 years old. Around 50% of individuals with colorectal cancer do not report any symptoms.

Rectal bleeding or anemia are high-risk symptoms in people over the age of 50. Weight loss and changes in a person's bowel habit are typically only concerning if they are associated with rectal bleeding.

Cause
75–95% of colorectal cancer cases occur in people with little or no genetic risk. Risk factors include older age, male sex, high intake of fat, sugar, alcohol, red meat, processed meats, obesity, smoking, and a lack of physical exercise. Approximately 10% of cases are linked to insufficient activity. The risk from alcohol appears to increase at greater than one drink per day. Drinking five glasses of water a day is linked to a decrease in the risk of colorectal cancer and adenomatous polyps. Streptococcus gallolyticus is associated with colorectal cancer. Some strains of Streptococcus bovis/Streptococcus equinus complex are consumed by millions of people daily and thus may be safe. 25 to 80% of people with Streptococcus bovis/gallolyticus bacteremia have concomitant colorectal tumors. Seroprevalence of Streptococcus bovis/gallolyticus is considered as a candidate practical marker for the early prediction of an underlying bowel lesion at high risk population. It has been suggested that the presence of antibodies to Streptococcus bovis/gallolyticus antigens or the antigens themselves in the bloodstream may act as markers for the carcinogenesis in the colon.

Pathogenic Escherichia coli may increase the risk of colorectal cancer by producing the genotoxic metabolite, colibactin.

Inflammatory bowel disease
People with inflammatory bowel disease (ulcerative colitis and Crohn's disease) are at increased risk of colon cancer. The risk increases the longer a person has the disease, and the worse the severity of inflammation. In these high risk groups, both prevention with aspirin and regular colonoscopies are recommended. Endoscopic surveillance in this high-risk population may reduce the development of colorectal cancer through early diagnosis and may also reduce the chances of dying from colon cancer. People with inflammatory bowel disease account for less than 2% of colon cancer cases yearly. In those with Crohn's disease, 2% get colorectal cancer after 10 years, 8% after 20 years, and 18% after 30 years. In people who have ulcerative colitis, approximately 16% develop either a cancer precursor or cancer of the colon over 30 years.

Genetics
Those with a family history in two or more first-degree relatives (such as a parent or sibling) have a two to threefold greater risk of disease, and this group accounts for about 20% of all cases. A number of genetic syndromes are also associated with higher rates of colorectal cancer. The most common of these is hereditary nonpolyposis colorectal cancer (HNPCC, or Lynch syndrome) which is present in about 3% of people with colorectal cancer. Other syndromes that are strongly associated with colorectal cancer include Gardner syndrome and familial adenomatous polyposis (FAP). For people with these syndromes, cancer almost always occurs and makes up 1% of the cancer cases. A total proctocolectomy may be recommended for people with FAP as a preventive measure due to the high risk of malignancy. Colectomy, removal of the colon, may not suffice as a preventive measure because of the high risk of rectal cancer if the rectum remains. The most common polyposis syndrome affecting the colon is serrated polyposis syndrome, which is associated with a 25-40% risk of CRC.

Mutations in the pair of genes (POLE and POLD1) have been associated with familial colon cancer.

Most deaths due to colon cancer are associated with metastatic disease. A gene that appears to contribute to the potential for metastatic disease, metastasis associated in colon cancer 1 (MACC1), has been isolated. It is a transcriptional factor that influences the expression of hepatocyte growth factor. This gene is associated with the proliferation, invasion, and scattering of colon cancer cells in cell culture, and tumor growth and metastasis in mice. MACC1 may be a potential target for cancer intervention, but this possibility needs to be confirmed with clinical studies.

Epigenetic factors, such as abnormal DNA methylation of tumor suppressor promoters, play a role in the development of colorectal cancer.

Ashkenazi Jews have a 6% higher risk rate of getting adenomas and then colon cancer due to mutations in the APC gene being more common.

Pathogenesis
Colorectal cancer is a disease originating from the epithelial cells lining the colon or rectum of the gastrointestinal tract, most frequently as a result of mutations in the Wnt signaling pathway that increase signaling activity. The mutations can be inherited or acquired, and most probably occur in the intestinal crypt stem cell. The most commonly mutated gene in all colorectal cancer is the APC gene, which produces the APC protein. The APC protein prevents the accumulation of β-catenin protein. Without APC, β-catenin accumulates to high levels and translocates (moves) into the nucleus, binds to DNA, and activates the transcription of proto-oncogenes. These genes are normally important for stem cell renewal and differentiation, but when inappropriately expressed at high levels, they can cause cancer. While APC is mutated in most colon cancers, some cancers have increased β-catenin because of mutations in β-catenin (CTNNB1) that block its own breakdown, or have mutations in other genes with function similar to APC such as AXIN1, AXIN2, TCF7L2, or NKD1.

Beyond the defects in the Wnt signaling pathway, other mutations must occur for the cell to become cancerous. The p53 protein, produced by the TP53 gene, normally monitors cell division and induces their programmed death if they have Wnt pathway defects. Eventually, a cell line acquires a mutation in the TP53 gene and transforms the tissue from a benign epithelial tumor into an invasive epithelial cell cancer. Sometimes the gene encoding p53 is not mutated, but another protective protein named BAX is mutated instead.

Other proteins responsible for programmed cell death that are commonly deactivated in colorectal cancers are TGF-β and DCC (Deleted in Colorectal Cancer). TGF-β has a deactivating mutation in at least half of colorectal cancers. Sometimes TGF-β is not deactivated, but a downstream protein named SMAD is deactivated. DCC commonly has a deleted segment of a chromosome in colorectal cancer.

Approximately 70% of all human genes are expressed in colorectal cancer, with just over 1% of having increased expression in colorectal cancer compared to other forms of cancer. Some genes are oncogenes: they are overexpressed in colorectal cancer. For example, genes encoding the proteins KRAS, RAF, and PI3K, which normally stimulate the cell to divide in response to growth factors, can acquire mutations that result in over-activation of cell proliferation. The chronological order of mutations is sometimes important. If a previous APC mutation occurred, a primary KRAS mutation often progresses to cancer rather than a self-limiting hyperplastic or borderline lesion. PTEN, a tumor suppressor, normally inhibits PI3K, but can sometimes become mutated and deactivated.

Comprehensive, genome-scale analysis has revealed that colorectal carcinomas can be categorized into hypermutated and non-hypermutated tumor types. In addition to the oncogenic and inactivating mutations described for the genes above, non-hypermutated samples also contain mutated CTNNB1, FAM123B, SOX9, ATM, and ARID1A. Progressing through a distinct set of genetic events, hypermutated tumors display mutated forms of ACVR2A, TGFBR2, MSH3, MSH6, SLC9A9, TCF7L2, and BRAF. The common theme among these genes, across both tumor types, is their involvement in Wnt and TGF-β signaling pathways, which results in increased activity of MYC, a central player in colorectal cancer.

Mismatch repair (MMR) deficient tumours are characterized by a relatively high amount of poly-nucleotide tandem repeats. This is caused by a deficiency in MMR proteins – which are typically caused by epigenetic silencing and or inherited mutations (e.g., Lynch syndrome). 15 to 18 percent of colorectal cancer tumours have MMR deficiencies, with 3 percent developing due to Lynch syndrome. The role of the mismatch repair system is to protect the integrity of the genetic material within cells (i.e., error detecting and correcting). Consequently, a deficiency in MMR proteins may lead to an inability to detect and repair genetic damage, allowing for further cancer-causing mutations to occur and colorectal cancer to progress.

The polyp to cancer progression sequence is the classical model of colorectal cancer pathogenesis. The polyp to cancer sequence describes the phases of transition from benign tumours into colorectal cancer over many years. Central to the polyp to CRC sequence are gene mutations, epigenetic alterations, and local inflammatory changes. The polyp to CRC sequence can be used as an underlying framework to illustrate how specific molecular changes lead to various cancer subtypes.

Field defects

The term "field cancerization" was first used in 1953 to describe an area or "field" of epithelium that has been preconditioned (by what were largely unknown processes at the time) to predispose it towards development of cancer. Since then, the terms "field cancerization", "field carcinogenesis", "field defect", and "field effect" have been used to describe pre-malignant or pre-neoplastic tissue in which new cancers are likely to arise.

Field defects are important in progression to colon cancer.

However, as pointed out by Rubin, "The vast majority of studies in cancer research has been done on well-defined tumors in vivo, or on discrete neoplastic foci in vitro. Yet there is evidence that more than 80% of the somatic mutations found in mutator phenotype human colorectal tumors occur before the onset of terminal clonal expansion." Similarly, Vogelstein et al. pointed out that more than half of somatic mutations identified in tumors occurred in a pre-neoplastic phase (in a field defect), during growth of apparently normal cells. Likewise, epigenetic alterations present in tumors may have occurred in pre-neoplastic field defects.

An expanded view of field effect has been termed "etiologic field effect", which encompasses not only molecular and pathologic changes in pre-neoplastic cells but also influences of exogenous environmental factors and molecular changes in the local microenvironment on neoplastic evolution from tumor initiation to death.

Epigenetics
Epigenetic alterations are much more frequent in colon cancer than genetic (mutational) alterations. As described by Vogelstein et al., an average cancer of the colon has only 1 or 2 oncogene mutations and 1 to 5 tumor suppressor mutations (together designated "driver mutations"), with about 60 further "passenger" mutations. The oncogenes and tumor suppressor genes are well studied and are described above under Pathogenesis.

In addition to epigenetic alteration of expression of miRNAs, other common types of epigenetic alterations in cancers that change gene expression levels include direct hypermethylation or hypomethylation of CpG islands of protein-encoding genes and alterations in histones and chromosomal architecture that influence gene expression. As an example, 147 hypermethylations and 27 hypomethylations of protein coding genes were frequently associated with colorectal cancers. Of the hypermethylated genes, 10 were hypermethylated in 100% of colon cancers, and many others were hypermethylated in more than 50% of colon cancers. In addition, 11 hypermethylations and 96 hypomethylations of miRNAs were also associated with colorectal cancers. Abnormal (aberrant) methylation occurs as a normal consequence of normal aging and the risk of colorectal cancer increases as a person gets older. The source and trigger of this age-related methylation is unknown. Approximately half of the genes that show age-related methylation changes are the same genes that have been identified to be involved in the development of colorectal cancer. These findings may suggest a reason for age being associated with the increased risk of developing colorectal cancer.

Epigenetic reductions of DNA repair enzyme expression may likely lead to the genomic and epigenomic instability characteristic of cancer. As summarized in the articles Carcinogenesis and Neoplasm, for sporadic cancers in general, a deficiency in DNA repair is occasionally due to a mutation in a DNA repair gene, but is much more frequently due to epigenetic alterations that reduce or silence expression of DNA repair genes.

Epigenetic alterations involved in the development of colorectal cancer may affect a person's response to chemotherapy.

Genomics | Epigenomics

Consensus molecular subtypes (CMS) classification of colorectal cancer was first introduced in 2015. CMS classification so far has been considered the most robust classification system available for CRC that has a clear biological interpretability and the basis for future clinical stratification and subtype-based targeted interventions.

A novel Epigenome-based Classification (EpiC) of colorectal cancer was proposed in 2021 introducing 4 enhancer subtypes in people with CRC. Chromatin states using 6 histone marks are characterized to identify EpiC subtypes. A combinatorial therapeutic approach based on the previously introduced consensus molecular subtypes (CMSs) and EpiCs could significantly enhance current treatment strategies.

Diagnosis

Colorectal cancer diagnosis is performed by sampling of areas of the colon suspicious for possible tumor development, typically during colonoscopy or sigmoidoscopy, depending on the location of the lesion. It is confirmed by microscopical examination of a tissue sample.

Medical imaging
A colorectal cancer is sometimes initially discovered on CT scan.

Presence of metastases is determined by a CT scan of the chest, abdomen and pelvis. Other potential imaging tests such as PET and MRI may be used in certain cases. The latter is often used for rectal lesions to determine its local stage and to facilitate preoperative planning.

Histopathology

The histopathologic characteristics of the tumor are reported from the analysis of tissue taken from a biopsy or surgery. A pathology report contains a description of the microscopical characteristics of the tumor tissue, including both tumor cells and how the tumor invades into healthy tissues and finally if the tumor appears to be completely removed. The most common form of colon cancer is adenocarcinoma, constituting between 95% to 98% of all cases of colorectal cancer. Other, rarer types include lymphoma, adenosquamous and squamous cell carcinoma. Some subtypes are more aggressive. Immunohistochemistry may be used in uncertain cases.

Staging

Staging of the cancer is based on both radiological and pathological findings. As with most other forms of cancer, tumor staging is based on the TNM system which considers how much the initial tumor has spread and the presence of metastases in lymph nodes and more distant organs. The AJCC 8th edition was published in 2018.

Prevention
It has been estimated that about half of colorectal cancer cases are due to lifestyle factors, and about a quarter of all cases are preventable. Increasing surveillance, engaging in physical activity, consuming a diet high in fiber, and reducing smoking and alcohol consumption decrease the risk.

Lifestyle
Lifestyle risk factors with strong evidence include lack of exercise, cigarette smoking, alcohol, and obesity. The risk of colon cancer can be reduced by maintaining a normal body weight through a combination of sufficient exercise and eating a healthy diet.

Current research consistently links eating more red meat and processed meat to a higher risk of the disease. Starting in the 1970s, dietary recommendations to prevent colorectal cancer often included increasing the consumption of whole grains, fruits and vegetables, and reducing the intake of red meat and processed meats. This was based on animal studies and retrospective observational studies. However, large scale prospective studies have failed to demonstrate a significant protective effect, and due to the multiple causes of cancer and the complexity of studying correlations between diet and health, it is uncertain whether any specific dietary interventions will have significant protective effects. In 2018 the National Cancer Institute stated that "There is no reliable evidence that a diet started in adulthood that is low in fat and meat and high in fiber, fruits, and vegetables reduces the risk of CRC by a clinically important degree."

According to the World Cancer Research Fund, consuming alcohol drinks and consuming processed meat both increase the risk of colorectal cancer.

The 2014 World Health Organization cancer report noted that it has been hypothesized that dietary fiber might help prevent colorectal cancer, but most studies have not borne this out, and status of the science remained unclear as of 2014. A 2019 review, however, found evidence of benefit from dietary fiber and whole grains. The World Cancer Research Fund listed the benefit of fiber for prevention of colorectal cancer as "probable" as of 2017. A 2022 umbrella review says there is "convincing evidence" for that association.

Higher physical activity is recommended. Physical exercise is associated with a modest reduction in colon but not rectal cancer risk. High levels of physical activity reduce the risk of colon cancer by about 21%. Sitting regularly for prolonged periods is associated with higher mortality from colon cancer. Regular exercise does not negate the risk but does lower it.

Medication and supplements
Aspirin and celecoxib appear to decrease the risk of colorectal cancer in those at high risk. Aspirin is recommended in those who are 50 to 60 years old, do not have an increased risk of bleeding, and are at risk for cardiovascular disease to prevent colorectal cancer. It is not recommended in those at average risk.

There is tentative evidence for calcium supplementation, but it is not sufficient to make a recommendation. Vitamin D intake and blood levels are associated with a lower risk of colon cancer.

Screening
As more than 80% of colorectal cancers arise from adenomatous polyps, screening for this cancer is effective for both early detection and for prevention. Diagnosis of cases of colorectal cancer through screening tends to occur 2–3 years before diagnosis of cases with symptoms. Any polyps that are detected can be removed, usually by colonoscopy or sigmoidoscopy, and thus prevent them from turning into cancer. Screening has the potential to reduce colorectal cancer deaths by 60%.

The three main screening tests are colonoscopy, fecal occult blood testing, and flexible sigmoidoscopy. Of the three, only sigmoidoscopy cannot screen the right side of the colon where 42% of cancers are found. Flexible sigmoidoscopy, however, has the best evidence for decreasing the risk of death from any cause.

Fecal occult blood testing (FOBT) of the stool is typically recommended every two years and can be either guaiac-based or immunochemical. If abnormal FOBT results are found, participants are typically referred for a follow-up colonoscopy examination. When done once every 1–2 years, FOBT screening reduces colorectal cancer deaths by 16% and among those participating in screening, colorectal cancer deaths can be reduced up to 23%, although it has not been proven to reduce all-cause mortality. Immunochemical tests are accurate and do not require dietary or medication changes before testing. However, research in the UK has found that for these immunochemical tests, the threshold for further investigation is set at a point that may miss more than half of bowel cancer cases. The research suggests that the NHS England's Bowel Cancer Screening Programme could make better use of the test's ability to provide the exact concentration of blood in faeces (rather than only whether it is above or below a cutoff level).

Other options include virtual colonoscopy and stool DNA screening testing (FIT-DNA). Virtual colonoscopy via a CT scan appears as good as standard colonoscopy for detecting cancers and large adenomas but is expensive, associated with radiation exposure, and cannot remove any detected abnormal growths as standard colonoscopy can. Stool DNA screening test looks for biomarkers associated with colorectal cancer and precancerous lesions, including altered DNA and blood hemoglobin. A positive result should be followed by colonoscopy. FIT-DNA has more false positives than FIT and thus results in more adverse effects. Further study is required as of 2016 to determine whether a three-year screening interval is correct.

Recommendations
In the United States, screening is typically recommended between ages 50 to 75 years. The American Cancer Society recommends starting at the age of 45. For those between 76 and 85 years old, the decision to screen should be individualized. For those at high risk, screenings usually begin at around 40.

Several screening methods are recommended including stool-based tests every 2 years, sigmoidoscopy every 10 years with fecal immunochemical testing every two years, and colonoscopy every 10 years. It is unclear which of these two methods is better. Colonoscopy may find more cancers in the first part of the colon, but is associated with greater cost and more complications. For people with average risk who have had a high-quality colonoscopy with normal results, the American Gastroenterological Association does not recommend any type of screening in the 10 years following the colonoscopy. For people over 75 or those with a life expectancy of less than 10 years, screening is not recommended. It takes about 10 years after screening for one out of a 1000 people to benefit. The USPSTF list seven potential strategies for screening, with the most important thing being that at least one of these strategies is appropriately used.

In Canada, among those 50 to 75 years old at normal risk, fecal immunochemical testing or FOBT is recommended every two years or sigmoidoscopy every 10 years. Colonoscopy is less preferred.

Some countries have national colorectal screening programs which offer FOBT screening for all adults within a certain age group, typically starting between ages 50 to 60. Examples of countries with organised screening include the United Kingdom, Australia, the Netherlands, Hong Kong, and Taiwan.

The UK Bowel Cancer Screening Programme aims to find warning signs in people aged 60 to 74, by recommending a faecal immunochemical test (FIT) every two years. FIT measures blood in faeces, and people with levels above a certain threshold may have bowel tissue examined for signs of cancer. Growths having cancerous potential are removed.

Treatment
The treatment of colorectal cancer can be aimed at cure or palliation. The decision on which aim to adopt depends on various factors, including the person's health and preferences, as well as the stage of the tumor. Assessment in multidisciplinary teams is a critical part of determining whether the patient is suitable for surgery or not. When colorectal cancer is caught early, surgery can be curative. However, when it is detected at later stages (for which metastases are present), this is less likely and treatment is often directed at palliation, to relieve symptoms caused by the tumour and keep the person as comfortable as possible.

Surgery

At an early stage, colorectal cancer may be removed during a colonoscopy using one of several techniques, including endoscopic mucosal resection or endoscopic submucosal dissection. For people with localized cancer, the preferred treatment is complete surgical removal with adequate margins, with the attempt of achieving a cure. The procedure of choice is a partial colectomy (or proctocolectomy for rectal lesions) where the affected part of the colon or rectum is removed along with parts of its mesocolon and blood supply to facilitate removal of draining lymph nodes. This can be done either by an open laparotomy or laparoscopically, depending on factors related to the individual person and lesion factors. The colon may then be reconnected or a person may have a colostomy.

If there are only a few metastases in the liver or lungs, these may also be removed. Chemotherapy may be used before surgery to shrink the cancer before attempting to remove it. The two most common sites of recurrence of colorectal cancer are the liver and lungs. For peritoneal carcinomatosis cytoreductive surgery, sometimes in combination with HIPEC can be used in an attempt to remove the cancer.

Chemotherapy
In both cancer of the colon and rectum, chemotherapy may be used in addition to surgery in certain cases. The decision to add chemotherapy in management of colon and rectal cancer depends on the stage of the disease.

In Stage I colon cancer, no chemotherapy is offered, and surgery is the definitive treatment. The role of chemotherapy in Stage II colon cancer is debatable, and is usually not offered unless risk factors such as T4 tumor, undifferentiated tumor, vascular and perineural invasion or inadequate lymph node sampling is identified. It is also known that the people who carry abnormalities of the mismatch repair genes do not benefit from chemotherapy. For stage III and Stage IV colon cancer, chemotherapy is an integral part of treatment.

If cancer has spread to the lymph nodes or distant organs, which is the case with stage III and stage IV colon cancer respectively, adding chemotherapy agents fluorouracil, capecitabine or oxaliplatin increases life expectancy. If the lymph nodes do not contain cancer, the benefits of chemotherapy are controversial. If the cancer is widely metastatic or unresectable, treatment is then palliative. Typically in this setting, a number of different chemotherapy medications may be used. Chemotherapy drugs for this condition may include capecitabine, fluorouracil, irinotecan, oxaliplatin and UFT. The drugs capecitabine and fluorouracil are interchangeable, with capecitabine being an oral medication and fluorouracil being an intravenous medicine. Some specific regimens used for CRC are CAPOX, FOLFOX, FOLFOXIRI, and FOLFIRI. Antiangiogenic drugs such as bevacizumab are often added in first line therapy. Another class of drugs used in the second line setting are epidermal growth factor receptor inhibitors, of which the three FDA approved ones are aflibercept, cetuximab and panitumumab.

The primary difference in the approach to low stage rectal cancer is the incorporation of radiation therapy. Often, it is used in conjunction with chemotherapy in a neoadjuvant fashion to enable surgical resection, so that ultimately a colostomy is not required. However, it may not be possible in low lying tumors, in which case, a permanent colostomy may be required. Stage IV rectal cancer is treated similar to stage IV colon cancer.

Stage IV colorectal cancer due to peritoneal carcinomatosis can be treated using HIPEC combined with cytoreductive surgery, in some people.

Radiation therapy
While a combination of radiation and chemotherapy may be useful for rectal cancer, for some people requiring treatment, chemoradiotherapy can increase acute treatment-related toxicity, and has not been shown to improve survival rates compared to radiotherapy alone, although it is associated with less local recurrence.  The use of radiotherapy in colon cancer is not routine due to the sensitivity of the bowels to radiation. As with chemotherapy, radiotherapy can be used as a neoadjuvant for clinical stages T3 and T4 for rectal cancer. This results in downsizing or downstaging of the tumour, preparing it for surgical resection, and also decreases local recurrence rates. For locally advanced rectal cancer, neoadjuvant chemoradiotherapy has become the standard treatment. Additionally, when surgery is not possible radiation therapy has been suggested to be an effective treatment against CRC pulmonary metastases, which are developed by 10-15% of people with CRC.

Immunotherapy 
Immunotherapy with immune checkpoint inhibitors has been found to be useful for a type of colorectal cancer with mismatch repair deficiency and microsatellite instability. Pembrolizumab is approved for advanced CRC tumours that are MMR deficient and have failed usual treatments. Most people who do improve, however, still worsen after months or years.

On the other hand, in a prospective phase 2 study published in June 2022 in The New England Journal of Medicine, 12 patients with Deficient Mismatch Repair (dMMR) stage II or III rectal adenocarcinoma were administered single-agent dostarlimab, an anti–PD-1 monoclonal antibody, every three weeks for six months. After a median follow-up of 12 months (range, 6 to 25 months), all 12 patients had a complete clinical response with no evidence of tumor on MRI, 18F-fluorodeoxyglucose–positron-emission tomography, endoscopic evaluation, digital rectal examination, or biopsy. Moreover, no patient in the trial needed chemoradiotherapy or surgery, and no patient reported adverse events of grade 3 or higher. However, although the results of this study are promising, the study is small and has uncertainties about long-term outcomes.

Palliative care
Palliative care is recommended for any person who has advanced colon cancer or who has significant symptoms.

Involvement of palliative care may be beneficial to improve the quality of life for both the person and his or her family, by improving symptoms, anxiety and preventing admissions to the hospital.

In people with incurable colorectal cancer, palliative care can consist of procedures that relieve symptoms or complications from the cancer but do not attempt to cure the underlying cancer, thereby improving quality of life. Surgical options may include non-curative surgical removal of some of the cancer tissue, bypassing part of the intestines, or stent placement. These procedures can be considered to improve symptoms and reduce complications such as bleeding from the tumor, abdominal pain and intestinal obstruction. Non-operative methods of symptomatic treatment include radiation therapy to decrease tumor size as well as pain medications.

Follow-up

The U.S. National Comprehensive Cancer Network and American Society of Clinical Oncology provide guidelines for the follow-up of colon cancer. A medical history and physical examination are recommended every 3 to 6 months for 2 years, then every 6 months for 5 years. Carcinoembryonic antigen blood level measurements follow the same timing, but are only advised for people with T2 or greater lesions who are candidates for intervention. A CT-scan of the chest, abdomen and pelvis can be considered annually for the first 3 years for people who are at high risk of recurrence (for example, those who had poorly differentiated tumors or venous or lymphatic invasion) and are candidates for curative surgery (with the aim to cure). A colonoscopy can be done after 1 year, except if it could not be done during the initial staging because of an obstructing mass, in which case it should be performed after 3 to 6 months. If a villous polyp, a polyp >1 centimeter or high-grade dysplasia is found, it can be repeated after 3 years, then every 5 years. For other abnormalities, the colonoscopy can be repeated after 1 year.

Routine PET or ultrasound scanning, chest X-rays, complete blood count or liver function tests are not recommended.

For people who have undergone curative surgery or adjuvant therapy (or both) to treat non-metastatic colorectal cancer, intense surveillance and close follow-up have not been shown to provide additional survival benefits.

Exercise
Exercise may be recommended in the future as secondary therapy to cancer survivors. In epidemiological studies, exercise may decrease colorectal cancer-specific mortality and all-cause mortality. Results for the specific amounts of exercise needed to observe a benefit were conflicting. These differences may reflect differences in tumour biology and the expression of biomarkers. People with tumors that lacked CTNNB1 expression (β-catenin), involved in Wnt signalling pathway, required more than 18 Metabolic equivalent (MET) hours per week, a measure of exercise, to observe a reduction in colorectal cancer mortality. The mechanism of how exercise benefits survival may be involved in immune surveillance and inflammation pathways. In clinical studies, a pro-inflammatory response was found in people with stage II-III colorectal cancer who underwent 2 weeks of moderate exercise after completing their primary therapy. Oxidative balance may be another possible mechanism for benefits observed. A significant decrease in 8-oxo-dG was found in the urine of people who underwent 2 weeks of moderate exercise after primary therapy. Other possible mechanisms may involve metabolic hormone and sex-steroid hormones, although these pathways may be involved in other types of cancers.

Another potential biomarker may be p27. Survivors with tumors that expressed p27 and performed greater and equal to 18 MET hours per week were found to have reduced colorectal cancer mortality survival compared to those with less than 18 MET hours per week. Survivors without p27 expression who exercised were shown to have worse outcomes. The constitutive activation of PI3K/AKT/mTOR pathway may explain the loss of p27 and excess energy balance may up-regulate p27 to stop cancer cells from dividing.

Physical activity provides benefits to people with non-advanced colorectal cancer. Improvements in aerobic fitness, cancer-related fatigue and health-related quality of life have been reported in the short term. However, these improvements were not observed at the level of disease-related mental health, such as anxiety and depression.

Prognosis
Fewer than 600 genes are linked to outcomes in colorectal cancer. These include both unfavorable genes, where high expression is related to poor outcome, for example the heat shock 70 kDa protein 1 (HSPA1A), and favorable genes where high expression is associated with better survival, for example the putative RNA-binding protein 3 (RBM3).

Recurrence rates

The average five-year recurrence rate in people where surgery is successful is 5% for stage I cancers, 12% in stage II and 33% in stage III. However, depending on the number of risk factors it ranges from 9–22% in stage II and 17–44% in stage III.

Survival rates
In Europe the five-year survival rate for colorectal cancer is less than 60%. In the developed world about a third of people who get the disease die from it.

Survival is directly related to detection and the type of cancer involved, but overall is poor for symptomatic cancers, as they are typically quite advanced. Survival rates for early stage detection are about five times that of late stage cancers. People with a tumor that has not breached the muscularis mucosa (TNM stage Tis, N0, M0) have a five-year survival rate of 100%, while those with invasive cancer of T1 (within the submucosal layer) or T2 (within the muscular layer) have an average five-year survival rate of approximately 90%. Those with a more invasive tumor yet without node involvement (T3-4, N0, M0) have an average five-year survival rate of approximately 70%. People with positive regional lymph nodes (any T, N1-3, M0) have an average five-year survival rate of approximately 40%, while those with distant metastases (any T, any N, M1) have a poor prognosis and the five year survival ranges from <5 percent to 31 percent. The prognosis depends on a multitude of factors which include the physical fitness level of the person, extent of metastases, and tumor grade.

Whilst the impact of colorectal cancer on those who survive varies greatly there will often be a need to adapt to both physical and psychological outcomes of the illness and its treatment. For example, it is common for people to experience incontinence, sexual dysfunction, problems with stoma care and fear of cancer recurrence after primary treatment has concluded.

A qualitative systematic review published in 2021 highlighted that there are three main factors influencing adaptation to living with and beyond colorectal cancer: support mechanisms, severity of late effects of treatment and psychosocial adjustment. Therefore, it is essential that people are offered appropriate support to help them better adapt to life following treatment.

Epidemiology

Globally more than 1 million people get colorectal cancer every year resulting in about 715,000 deaths as of 2010 up from 490,000 in 1990.

, it is the second most common cause of cancer in women (9.2% of diagnoses) and the third most common in men (10.0%) with it being the fourth most common cause of cancer death after lung, stomach, and liver cancer. It is more common in developed than developing countries. Global incidence varies 10-fold, with highest rates in Australia, New Zealand, Europe and the US and lowest rates in Africa and South-Central Asia.

United States
In 2022, the incidence of colorectal cancer in the United States was anticipated to be about 151,000 adults, including over 106,000 new cases of colon cancer (some 54,000 men and 52,000 women) and about 45,000 new cases of rectal cancer. Since the 1980s, the incidence of colorectal cancer decreased, dropping by about 2% annually from 2014 to 2018 in adults aged 50 and older, due mainly to improved screening.

United Kingdom
In the UK about 41,000 people a year get colon cancer making it the fourth most common type.

Australia 
One in 19 men and one in 28 women in Australia will develop colorectal cancer before the age of 75; one in 10 men and one in 15 women will develop it by 85 years of age.

Papua New Guinea 
In the developing countries like Papua New Guinea and other Pacific Island States including the Solomon Islands, colorectal cancer is a very rare cancer amongst the people, which is least common compared to lung, stomach, liver or breast cancer. It is estimated that at least 8 in 100,000 of the people are most likely to developed colorectal cancer every year, which is unlike lung or breast cancer, where for the latter alone is 24 in 100,000 of the women folks alone.

History
Rectal cancer has been diagnosed in an Ancient Egyptian mummy who had lived in the Dakhleh Oasis during the Ptolemaic period.

Society and culture

In the United States, March is colorectal cancer awareness month.

Research
Preliminary in-vitro evidence suggests lactic acid bacteria (e.g., lactobacilli, streptococci or lactococci) may be protective against the development and progression of colorectal cancer through several mechanisms such as antioxidant activity, immunomodulation, promoting programmed cell death, antiproliferative effects, and epigenetic modification of cancer cells.

Mouse models of colorectal and intestinal cancer have been developed and are used in research.
 The Cancer Genome Atlas
 The Colorectal Cancer Atlas integrating genomic and proteomic data pertaining to colorectal cancer tissues and cell lines have been developed.

See also
 Fecal occult blood

References

External links 

 

 
Conditions diagnosed by stool test
Infectious causes of cancer
Wikipedia medicine articles ready to translate